The UK Albums Chart is one of many music charts compiled by the Official Charts Company that calculates the best-selling albums of the week in the United Kingdom. Before 2004, the chart was only based on the sales of physical albums. This list shows albums that peaked in the Top 10 of the UK Albums Chart during 1988, as well as albums which peaked in 1987 and 1989 but were in the top 10 in 1988. The entry date is when the album appeared in the top ten for the first time (week ending, as published by the Official Charts Company, which is six days after the chart is announced).

The first new number-one album of the year was Popped In Souled Out by Wet Wet Wet. Overall, eighteen different albums peaked at number-one in 1988.

Top-ten albums
Key

See also
1988 in British music
List of number-one albums from the 1980s (UK)

References
General

Specific

External links
1988 album chart archive at the Official Charts Company (click on relevant week)

United Kingdom top 10 albums
Top 10 albums
1988